Caecogobius cryptophthalmus is a species of goby that is endemic to underground habitats in Calbiga on the Philippine island of Samar. This species is one of two members of the genus Caecogobius (the other is C. personatus), which are the only known cavefish in the Philippines. Like other cavefish, C. cryptophthalmus has reduced eyes and pigmentation.

References

Cave fish
Gobionellinae

Fish described in 1991